The University of Sancti Spíritus "José Martí Pérez" (UNISS) is a public university located in Sancti Spíritus, Cuba. It was founded in 1976 and is organized in four faculties.

Organization

These are the four faculties in which the university is divided into:

 Faculty of Engineering
 Faculty of Accounting and Finances
 Faculty of Agriculture
 Faculty of Humanities

See also 

Education in Cuba
List of universities in Cuba
 Sancti Spíritus

References

External links
 University of Sancti Spíritus Website 

Sancti Spíritus
Educational institutions established in 1976
Buildings and structures in Sancti Spíritus